Oofie (stylized in all caps) is the second studio album by American rapper Wiki. It was released on November 8, 2019 by his own independent label Wikset.

It features guest appearances from Denzel Curry, Princess Nokia, Your Old Droog, Lil Ugly Mane, Duendita and Lansky Jones.

Track listing 

 signifies an additional producer
 "Intro" features additional vocals by Ben Vernon

Personnel 
Credits adapted from Bandcamp

 Wiki - primary artist, vocals
 Alex Epton - producer , congas , synth 
 SadhuGold - producer 
 Nah - producer 
 Ben Vernon - additional vocals 
 Roofeeo - producer 
 Tony Seltzer - producer 
 Denzel Curry - featured artist 
 Travis Miller - featured artist , producer 
 Melvin Hodore - bass 
 Carlos Hernandez - synth , piano 
 Sporting Life - producer 
 Isaac Sleator - piano 
 Slauson Malone - producer 
 Your Old Droog - featured artist 
 Lansky Jones - featured artist 
 Laron - producer 
 Matt Lubansky - producer 
 Rob Mack - producer 
 Micachu - producer 
 NYOP - producer 
 duendita - featured artist 
 Jonti - producer 
 Faze Miyake - producer 
 Isaiah Barr - saxophone 
 Ghostdaddy - sitar

References

External links 
 

2019 albums
Hip hop albums by American artists